The Arma Mountains are a mountain range in the Zurmat District of the Paktia province of Afghanistan.

References

Mountain ranges of Afghanistan